Jonathan Gruber, more commonly known as J. Mackye Gruber, is an American screenwriter and film director, probably best known for co-writing Final Destination 2 and co-writing and co-directing The Butterfly Effect.

Gruber always writes with a partner.  He frequently collaborates with Eric Bress.

Gruber is a graduate of USC School of Cinematic Arts. He has a background in cinematography.

Filmography

Film

Television 
The numbers in directing and writing credits refer to the number of episodes.

References

External links
 
 Interview with Eric Bress and J. Mackye Gruber

Living people
Year of birth missing (living people)
American male screenwriters